Released in 1990, Reference Point is the first album by Acoustic Alchemy released for jazz label GRP and their fourth album overall. The song "Caravan of Dreams" was nominated for a Grammy Award in 1990 for Best New Age Performance.

Containing some of the band's more popular tracks, such as the title track "Reference Point", "Same Road, Same Reason" and "Cuban Heels", the nine-track album is also the only album by the band to offer a cover track: "Take Five".

Awards
32nd Annual Grammy Awards

|-
|1990
| "Caravan of Dreams"
|Best New Age Performance
| 
|-
|}

Track listing

References

External links
Acoustic Alchemy Official Site

Acoustic Alchemy albums
GRP Records albums
1990 albums